Major League Baseball's drug policy prohibits players from using, possessing, selling, facilitating the sale of, distributing, or facilitating the distribution of any Drug of Abuse and/or Steroid. Any and all drugs or substances listed under Schedule II of the Controlled Substances Act are considered drugs of abuse covered by the Program. Players who require prescription medication can still use it with a "Therapeutic Use Exemption" granted by MLB.

In December 2019, MLB removed cannabinoids and added cocaine and opiates to its list of Drugs of Abuse. However, players were told that they could still be suspended for possessing or selling cannabis, or driving under the influence of cannabis.

List of banned substances (not exhaustive)

Drugs of abuse
 Synthetic THC and cannabimimetics (e.g., K2 and Spice)
 Cocaine
 LSD
 Opiates (e.g., fentanyl, oxycodone, heroin, codeine, and morphine)
 MDMA (Ecstasy)
 GHB
 Phencyclidine (PCP)

Steroids

 Androstadienedione
 Androstanediol
 Androstanedione
 Androstatrienedione (ATD)
 Androstenediol
 Androstenedione
 Androstenetrione (6-OXO)
 Bolandiol
 Bolasterone
 Boldenone
 Boldione
 Calusterone
 Clenbuterol
 Clostebol
 Danazol
 Dehydrochloromethyltestosterone
 Desoxy-methyltestosterone
 Δ1-Dihydrotestosterone
 4-Dihydrotestosterone
 Drostanolone
 Epi-dihydrotestosterone
 Epitestosterone
 Ethylestrenol
 Androstidie
 Fluoxymesterone
 Formebolone
 Furazabol
 13α-Ethyl-17a-hydroxygon-4-en-3-one
 Gestrinone
 4-Hydroxytestosterone 
 4-Hydroxy-19-nortestosterone
 Mestanolone
 Mesterolone
 Methandienone
 Methandriol
 Methasterone (Superdrol)
 Methenolone
 Methyldienolone
 Methylnortestosterone
 Methyltestosterone
 Methyltrienolone (Metribolone)
 Mibolerone
 17α-Methyl-Δ1-dihydrotestosterone
 Nandrolone
 Norandrostenediol
 Norandrostenedione
 Norbolethone
 Norclostebol
 Norethandrolone
 Oxabolone
 Oxandrolone
 Oxymesterone
 Oxymetholone
 Prostanozol
 Quinbolone
 Selective androgen receptor modulators (SARMs)
 Stanozolol
 Stenbolone
 Testosterone
 Tetrahydrogestrinone
 Tibolone
 Trenbolone
 Zeranol
 Zilpaterol
 Any salt, ester or ether of a drug or substance listed above
 Human growth hormone (hGH)
 Insulin-like growth factor (IGF-1), including all isomers of IGF-1 (mechano growth factors)
 Gonadotrophins (including LH and hCG)
 Aromatase inhibitors, including anastrozole, letrozole, aminoglutethimide, exemestane, formestane, and testolactone
 Selective estrogen receptor modulators, including raloxifen, tamoxifen, and toremifen
 Other Anti-estrogens, including clomiphene, cyclofenil, and fulvestrant

Stimulants

 Adrafinil
 Amfepramone (diethylproprion)
 Amiphenazole
 Amphetamine
 Amphetaminil
 Armodafinil
 Benfluorex
 Benzphetamine
 Benzylpiperazine
 Bromantan
 Carphedon
 Cathine (norpseudoephedrine)
 Chloroamphetamine
 Clobenzorex
 Cropropamide
 Crotetamide
 Dimethylamphetamine
 Ephedrine
 Etamivan
 Ethylamphetamine
 Etilefrine
 Famprofazone
 Fenbutrazate
 Fencamfamine
 Fenethylline
 Fenfluramine
 Fenproporex
 Furfenorex
 Heptaminol
 Isometheptene
 Meclofenoxate
 Mefenorex
 Mesocarb
 Mephentermine
 Methamphetamine (methylamphetamine)
 Methylenedioxyamphetamine
 Methylephedrine
 Methylhexaneamine (dimethylamylamine, DMAA)
 Modafinil
 Nikethamide
 Norfenefrine
 Norfenfluramine
 Octopamine
 Oxilofrine
 Pemoline
 Pentetrazol
 Phentermine
 Phenpromethamine
 Prenylamine
 Prolintane
 Phendimetrazine (phenmetrazine)
 Propylhexedrine
 Pyrovalerone
 Sibutramine
 Tuaminoheptane

Prohibited Substances may be added to the list only by the unanimous vote of HPAC, provided that the addition by the federal government of a substance to Schedule I, II, or III will automatically result in that substance being added to the list.

References

Major League Baseball controversies
Drugs in sport in the United States
Drug policy
Doping in baseball